Indonesian author Amir Hamzah (1911–1946) wrote 50 poems, 18 pieces of lyrical prose, 12 articles, 4 short stories, 3 poetry collections, and 1 book. He also translated 44 poems, 1 piece of lyrical prose, and 1 book. The majority of Amir's original poems are included in his collections Njanji Soenji (1937) and Boeah Rindoe (1941), both first published in the literary magazine Poedjangga Baroe. His translated poems were collected in Setanggi Timoer (1939). In 1962 documentarian HB Jassin compiled all of Amir's remaining works – except the book Sastera Melajoe Lama dan Radja-Radja'nja – as Amir Hamzah: Radja Penjair Pudjangga Baru.

Born in Langkat to Malay nobility, Amir completed his education at schools run by the Dutch colonial government in several cities on Sumatra and Java. By 1928 he had enrolled in a Meer Uitgebreid Lager Onderwijs (junior high school) in the colonial capital of Batavia (now Jakarta); he wrote his first poems during this period. His first published works, poems entitled "Maboek..." ("Nauseous...") and "Soenji" ("Silent"), appeared in the March 1932 issue of the magazine Timboel; by the end of the year he had published his first short stories and lyrical prose, some in Timboel and some in the magazine Pandji Poestaka.

One of these works, a lyrical prose piece entitled "Poedjangga Baroe" ("New Writer"), was meant to promote the magazine of the same name that Amir established in collaboration with Armijn Pane and Sutan Takdir Alisjahbana. The magazine, first released in July 1933, published the vast majority of Amir's writings; most were written before 1935, then published later. Forced to return to Langkat and marry in 1937, Amir became a representative of the nascent national government after the proclamation of Indonesian independence in 1945. The following year he was captured, detained, and later executed during a Communist Party-led revolution; his last writing, a fragment from his 1941 poem "Boeah Rindoe", was later found in his cell.

His earliest poems followed the conventions of traditional pantuns, including a four-line structure and rhyming couplets. Later works departed from this traditional structure, although Jassin considers Amir to have maintained an unmistakably Malay style of writing. Themes in his work varied: Boeah Rindoe, chronologically the first anthology written, was filled with a sense of longing and loss, while works in Njanji Soenji tended to be distinctly religious. Amir received wide recognition for his poems; Jassin dubbed him the "King of the Poedjangga Baroe-era Poets", while Dutch scholar of Indonesian literature A. Teeuw described Amir as the only international-class Indonesian poet from before the Indonesian National Revolution.

The following list is divided into tables based on the type of works contained within. The tables are initially arranged alphabetically by title, although they are also sortable. Titles are in the original spelling, with a literal English translation underneath. Untitled works are recorded with their first words in parentheses. Years given are for the first publication; later reprintings are not counted.


Books

Articles

Stories

Poetry collections

Original poems

Translated poems

Original lyrical prose

Translated lyrical prose

Translated books

Footnotes

Works cited

 
 

 

Bibliographies by writer
Amir Hamzah
Bibliographies of Indonesian writers